Kitron is a citron liqueur produced on the Greek island of Naxos. It is made from the fruit and leaves of the citron tree, which is similar to the lemon tree but stronger and slightly different in taste.

Kitron comes in three varieties.  The green variety is sweeter and contains less alcohol. The yellow variety is the strongest and has the least sugar.  Clear Kitron is somewhere in between.

The drink was briefly fashionable during the early 1980s, but is difficult to find today outside Naxos due to a shortage of citron trees.

The first distillery was established in 1896 in the village of Halki.

See also
 List of lemon dishes and beverages
 Greek citron

References

External links
 Naxos Official Site
 Naxos Island
 The Citron in Naxos by Greek Travel
 The Citrons of Naxos
 Halki Village of Naxos
 Greece 9 - Korina Miller, Kate Armstrong, Michael Stamatios Clark, Chris Deliso - Google Books
 A Dictionary of Food and Nutrition - David A. Bender - Google Books

Greek cuisine
Greek liqueurs
Citrus liqueurs
Lemon drinks
Citron